The Temptation of Carlton Earle is a 1923 British silent crime film directed by Wilfred Noy and starring C. Aubrey Smith, James Lindsay and Gertrude McCoy.

Cast
 C. Aubrey Smith as Carlton Earle  
 James Lindsay as Royston  
 Gertrude McCoy as Margaret Roynton  
 Simeon Stuart as Whitworth  
 Francis Innys as Pap  
 Lilian Gould as Jenny Taylor  
 Beatrice Trouville as Sylvia Conyers 
 Charles Poulton as Dr. Carr

References

Bibliography
 Low, Rachael. The History of the British Film 1918-1929. George Allen & Unwin, 1971.

External links
 

1923 films
1923 crime films
British crime films
British silent feature films
Films directed by Wilfred Noy
Films based on British novels
British black-and-white films
1920s English-language films
1920s British films
Silent crime films